Fikirte Addis (born August 3, 1981) is an Ethiopian fashion designer. In 2009, Addis formed her own label–Yefiker Design–which creates clothes that are modern interpretations of traditional Ethiopian dress. Her work rose to prominence by 2011, when she was a featured designer in the second annual Africa Fashion Week in New York City.

References 

Living people
Ethiopian businesspeople
Ethiopian fashion designers
1981 births